UHM and uhm may refer to:

Acronyms
Undersea and Hyperbaric Medical Society
Malta Workers' Union (Union Haddiema Maghqudin)
University of Hawaii at Manoa, Honolulu, USA

People
Um (Korean surname). People with this surname include:
 Uhm Bok-dong (1892–1951), Korean cyclist 
 Uhm Jung-hwa (born 1969), South Korean singer and actress
 Uhm Tae-woong (born 1974), South Korean actor
 Uhm Ji-won (born 1977), South Korean actress
 Uhm Tae-goo (born 1983), South Korean actor 
 Uhm Hyun-kyung (born 1986), South Korean actress

Other meanings
UHMK1 (UHM), a human protein